Rayonta Whitfield (born July 16, 1981) is an American professional boxer from Augusta, Georgia.

Amateur career
Whitfield was the 2002 Golden Gloves national champion.

Early career
He is a two-time North American Boxing Organization flyweight champion.

World title fight
He fought Omar Andres Narvaez for the World Boxing Organization flyweight title, losing in the 10th round by technical knockout.

Return
Due to his boxing gym nearly closing, Whitfield took a four-year hiatus from boxing, but has now returned. During his hiatus from boxing, Whitfield was able to resurrect the gym and is bringing it back to prominence. He has had several regional and national Silver Gloves and Golden Gloves champions including Justin DeLoach, Jade Ealy and Doctress Robinson. Ealy is currently the record holder for fastest debut KO in Georgia. Whitfield is currently signed to Evander Holyfield's Real Deal Boxing. All the above fighters are active the community and participate in training the up-and-coming youth fighters as well as adults. Classes and personal training are also available upon request

References

External links 
 

1981 births
Living people
Flyweight boxers
African-American boxers
American male boxers
Boxers from Augusta, Georgia (U.S. state)
21st-century African-American sportspeople
20th-century African-American people